"Circumstances" is a song by Canadian rock band Rush from its 1978 album Hemispheres. Lyrically, it is an autobiographical account by drummer  Neil Peart about the time he spent living in England, and his eventual disillusionment with his then-current occupations.

The song was played sporadically on the 1978-79 Tour of the Hemispheres, and did not return to Rush's setlists until the 2007 Snakes & Arrows Tour. On the latter tour, the song was played in a lower key than the original recording, to accommodate vocalist Geddy Lee's vocal range decreasing with age.

It is one of a few Rush songs with French lyrics, these occurring in the chorus: "Plus ça change, plus c'est la même chose" (the more it changes, the more it is the same).

See also
List of Rush songs

References

1978 songs
1978 singles
Rush (band) songs
Macaronic songs
Songs about England
Song recordings produced by Terry Brown (record producer)
Songs written by Neil Peart
Songs written by Geddy Lee
Songs written by Alex Lifeson
Anthem Records singles